Brickellia odontophylla is a Mexican species of flowering plants in the family Asteraceae. It is native to northern Mexico, in the states of Chihuahua, Coahuila, Nuevo León, Durango, and Zacatecas.

References

odontophylla
Flora of Mexico
Plants described in 1882